Walk Up (Korean: 탑, Revised Romanization: tab) is a 2022 South Korean drama film written, produced, directed, edited, and scored by Hong Sang-soo.

Plot 
Walk Up follows filmmaker Byung-soo and his estranged daughter Jeong-su as they visit a building owned by Ms. Kim, share a meal, and meet others who live in the building. The same event is seemingly repeated several times in different variations. Byung-soo later begins a relationship with a woman in the building and moves into one of the apartments.

Cast 

 Kwon Hae-hyo as Byung-soo
 Lee Hye-young as Ms. Kim
 Park Mi-so as Jeong-su
 Song Seon-mi as Sunhee
 Cho Yun-hee as Jiyoung
 Shin Seok-ho as waiter

Production 
Walk Up was filmed in black and white in Seoul in 2021. It was written, directed, edited, and produced by Hong, with music and cinematography by Hong. The production company was Jeonwonsa Film Company. Kim Min-hee served as production manager.

Release 
Walk Up premiered at the 2022 Toronto International Film Festival, where it screened out of competition. It was also shown in competition at the 70th San Sebastian International Film Festival on September 22, 2022 and premiered in the United States at the 2022 New York Film Festival. Walk Up premiered in theaters in South Korea on November 3, 2022. The film is distributed internationally by Finecut and in North America by Cinema Guild.

Reception 
Walk Up has received positive reviews from critics, holding a 100% positive rating on review aggregator Rotten Tomatoes, based on 13 critics and a score of 86 on Metacritic, based on 4 reviews, indicating "universal acclaim." Critics praised the film for being reflective and complex, and noted strengths in its acting, music, and tone.

References 

2022 drama films
South Korean drama films
Films directed by Hong Sang-soo